Anthony Vosalho (born 14 January 1975 in Saint-Geniès-de-Malgoirès) is a French retired footballer who played as a defender.

Vosalho spent most of his career playing for Nîmes Olympique, helping the club reach the 1996 Coupe de France Final. The following season, he starred as the club participated in the 1996–97 UEFA Cup Winners' Cup and won promotion to Ligue 2.

Vosalho joined Segunda División side Racing de Ferrol for the 2002–03 season. The club was relegated, and Vosalho nearly left because the club couldn't afford his wages. However, he stayed on and helped Racing de Ferrol make an immediate return to the Segunda División.

References

External links

1975 births
Living people
French footballers
Association football defenders
Ligue 1 players
Ligue 2 players
Nîmes Olympique players
Dijon FCO players
Segunda División players
Segunda División B players
Racing de Ferrol footballers
French expatriate footballers
Expatriate footballers in Spain
French expatriate sportspeople in Spain